Nartron Field  is an airport located 2 miles (3.2 km) north of Reed City, Michigan, US.

History
In 1954, local manufacturer Miller Industries built a small airstrip and hangar north of Reed City. Two years later, expansion of U.S. Highway 131 required the airstrip to be moved. Miller decided to rebuild it in a grand fashion, with buildings that showcased the aluminum and glass storefronts it sold. The new Miller Field included a 4,506-ft main runway, a terminal with a 1200-person auditorium and a control tower, a separate hangar building, and hydro-electric power generation.

In 1960, North Central Airlines began providing scheduled passenger service to the field as part of a route from Chicago (O'Hare) to Traverse City. North Central stopped serving Reed City in 1966, prompting Miller Industries to begin its own air service. Miller Airlines provided service on a route from Chicago (Meigs) to Cadillac, and in 1969 added service to Ludington and Detroit City Airport. This service lasted until 1971, when use of the airport began to decline. Miller Industries attempted to sell the field to Reed City for $1, but the City was not interested in maintaining the airport.

In 1979, the facility was purchased by Norman Rautiola, owner of Nartron Corporation. Nartron makes electronics for the automotive industry, and used the airport buildings for its engineering and manufacturing operations, including advanced product development and wire products assembly. These activities were moved to another location in the late 1980s.

Facilities
The abandoned terminal building, including a defunct control tower, sits on the southeast corner of the airport. It is locked and has nothing to offer to visiting aircraft.

An area east of runway 17/35 and north of the abandoned building is used by local RC model aircraft enthusiasts to fly model aircraft.

Runways
The only runway, 17/35, is in poor condition and the surface is cracked and scattered with stones. Vegetation grows through cracks.

An abandoned runway intersects runway 17/35. Its direction is approximately 8/26, and it was about 2500 ft. long. Part of it is now covered by an industrial storage lot.

Transit
The airport is accessible by road from Old US Highway 131, just north of the intersection with US 10. The airport is also adjacent to the US 131 freeway, accessible from US 10.

Notes

External links
 Michigan Airport Directory page for Nartron Field

Airports in Michigan
Buildings and structures in Osceola County, Michigan
Defunct airports in Michigan
Transportation in Osceola County, Michigan